Tetramitus is a genus of excavates.

References

Excavata genera